This is a list of members of the Provisional People's Representative Council. Following the dissolution of the People's Representative Council of the United States of Indonesia, the member of the council automatically became members of the provisional council. In addition, members of the senate and the Supreme Advisory Council also became members of the temporary council, due to the dissolution of both government bodies.

Speakers and Deputy Speakers

List

References

Bibliography 
 

Lists of political office-holders in Indonesia